Professor George Litefoot is a character who appeared in the 1977 Doctor Who television serial The Talons of Weng-Chiang. He was played by Trevor Baxter. He worked so well with Christopher Benjamin's character, Henry Gordon Jago, the production team briefly considered giving them their own spin-off series. In 2009 they reprised their roles for a Big Finish Productions audio drama, The Mahogany Murderers. This led to their own audio series, Jago & Litefoot. Litefoot's character also appeared in a 1997 Doctor Who novel, The Bodysnatchers.

Character history
George Litefoot was a pathologist, against the backdrop of Victorian era London. A learned, upper class, erudite English gentleman, he was raised in China, where his father was stationed as a soldier. In 1889, he met the Fourth Doctor and Leela, when a 51st Century fugitive tyrant named Magnus Greel was kidnapping helpless women. It was also at this time that Litefoot met theatre owner and Master of Ceremonies Henry Gordon Jago. The two remained close friends ever since.

In 1892, Litefoot started spending more time in one of Jago's favourite haunts, the Red Tavern, and befriending the barmaid, Ellie Higson. After that, Jago and Litefoot's investigations of infernal incidents in the paranormal became more frequent. Together, they saved the Empire from beasts, vampires, ghosts and other perils.

In 1894, Professor Litefoot came across grave robbing Zygons hiding under the Thames, which resulted in a reunion with the Doctor, this time in his eighth incarnation. Rather than explain the concept of regeneration, the Doctor claimed to be an associate of the Doctor that Litefoot knew. Jago did not participate in this adventure.

In 1895, Leela joins Litefoot and Jago in several adventures. Leela had been sent by the Time Lords to discover the cause of fractures in time. Shortly before she returns to Gallifrey, the three of them are reunited with the Doctor, this time in his sixth incarnation. He and his TARDIS were being stalked by temporal aliens, so the Doctor went into hiding, wearing dark Victorian garb and calling himself Claudius Dark. After learning his true identity, Litefoot and Jago were invited by the Doctor to take a few trips in the TARDIS, starting with a visit to the planet Venus.

Appearances

Television
 The Talons of Weng-Chiang (with the Fourth Doctor)

Audio
 The Mahogany Murderers
 The Bloodless Soldier
 The Bellova Devil
 The Spirit Trap
 The Similarity Engine
 Litefoot and Sanders
 The Necropolis Express
 The Theatre of Dreams
 The Ruthven Inheritance
 Dead Men's Tales
 The Man at the End of the Garden
 Swan Song
 Chronoclasm
 Jago in Love (with the Sixth Doctor)
 Beautiful Things (with the Sixth Doctor)
 The Lonely Clock (with the Sixth Doctor)
 The Hourglass Killers (with the Sixth Doctor)
 Voyage to Venus (with the Sixth Doctor)
 Voyage to the New World (with the Sixth Doctor)
 The Age of Revolution
 The Case of the Gluttonus Guru
 The Bloodchild Codex
 The Final Act
 The Justice of Jalxar (with the Fourth Doctor)

Novel
 The Bodysnatchers (with the Eighth Doctor)

References

External links
 Jago and Litefoot Audio Adventures

Recurring characters in Doctor Who
Doctor Who audio characters
Fictional gentleman detectives
Fictional pathologists
Fictional people from London
Male characters in television
Television characters introduced in 1977